Thomas Bunbury (1830–1907) was an Irish cleric in the late 19th and early 20th centuries.

He was born in 1830 at Shandrum and educated at Trinity College, Dublin. Ordained in 1854 he was a curate at Clonfert and then Mallow before becoming the incumbent of  Croom. He was Dean of Limerick from 1872 to 1899 when he became Bishop of Limerick, Ardfert and Aghadoe. He died in post on 19 January 1907.

References

1830 births
People from County Cork
Alumni of Trinity College Dublin
Deans of Limerick
19th-century Anglican bishops in Ireland
20th-century Anglican bishops in Ireland
Bishops of Limerick, Ardfert and Aghadoe
1907 deaths
Diocese of Limerick, Ardfert and Aghadoe